The Urbita Lake Railway was a  long miniature railway with a gauge of , which operated from approximately 1910 to at least August 1915 at Urbita Hot Springs Park (since 1966 the location of the Inland Center shopping mall) in San Bernardino, California.

History 
In 1910, the Pacific Electric Railway took-over the San Bernardino Valley Traction Company and thus became owner of the Urbita Hot Springs. At this time the Hot Springs were a very profitable business, which had been originally developed by R. Paragette in 1901. 

According to a contemporary newspaper, the railroad was unique, because it had probably the youngest president and oldest engineer in the world, the president being Buster ‘Buddy’ Courcy, at the age of two, and the engineer being the retired railway worker Bill Simpson from the San Bernardino Valley.

Locomotive 
The locomotive had some technical innovations, such as a valve control without eccentrics, which was easy to adjust and to maintain. The locomotive had automatic couplings and a bespoke oil burner, for which Coit filed a patent.

The locomotive had a weight of  including the tender, and  excluding the tender. The tender had a capacity of  water and  oil. The cylinders were  bore x stroke.

See also 
  Billy Jones Wildcat Railroad 
 Eastlake Park Scenic Railway
 Long Beach and Asbury Park Railway
 Seaside Park Railway
 Venice Miniature Railway

References 

San Bernardino, California
18 in gauge railways in the United States